David Ronald Payne (born 25 April 1947) is an English retired professional footballer, who played as a defender. He made 377 appearances in the Football League for Crystal Palace and Leyton Orient between 1964 and 1978. On retirement he joined the coaching staff at Millwall.

Playing career

Crystal Palace
Payne began his playing career as an apprentice at Crystal Palace on 1 January 1964, signed professional terms on 26 October, and made his professional debut in December of that year aged 17. Although primarily a defender, his versatility saw him fulfil a number of roles in the Palace team. Payne made 30 appearances in the 1968–9 season, which saw Palace reach the top tier for the first time, and was a regular in the club's subsequent four seasons in the top flight making 27, 31, 41 and 39 appearances respectively. During this period, Payne was given eight different numbered shirts, at a time when shirt numbers equated to playing position.

Leyton Orient
In August 1973, he signed for Leyton Orient, at that time managed by former Palace coach and playing colleague, George Petchey. In 1974, he suffered a broken leg, but recovered to make a total of 93 appearances for Orient. He retired as a player, in 1978.

Coaching career
On retirement he became youth team coach at Millwall helping them to win the F.A. Youth Cup in 1979, beating Manchester City 2–0 in the final.

International career
Payne made one appearance, as a substitute, for the then contemporary England under 23 team (equivalent to the later England under 21 side) on 1 November 1967 against Wales.

References

External links

Payne at holmesdale.net

1947 births
Living people
People from Thornton Heath
Footballers from the London Borough of Croydon
Crystal Palace F.C. players
Leyton Orient F.C. players
English Football League players
Association football defenders
English footballers
England under-23 international footballers
Millwall F.C. non-playing staff